Vasanthan is a surname. Notable people with the surname include:

James Vasanthan, Indian film score composer
Vallipuram Vasanthan (1966–1987), Sri Lankan Tamil rebel